Shakaskraal is a town in Ilembe District Municipality in the KwaZulu-Natal province of South Africa.

The Shakaskraal Mosque is one of the most prominent landmarks and easily identifiable by its expansive dome towers and sits directly opposite the towns hardware and building supply store uShaka Megabuild. Shakaskraal is central to Stanger and Ballito. Dominated by local businesses and informal traders. It is located on the R102 and can be accessed from the N2 from either direction. Main activities located in and nearby is sugar cane farming.

References

Populated places in the KwaDukuza Local Municipality